The King River is a river in the Great Southern region of Western Australia.

Description

The land along the river is estimated as being 83% cleared yet the water quality is generally healthy fresh water. The salinity level of the King River at discharge is 800 mg/L.

History
The river was named after an early explorer of the Australian and Patagonian coasts, Phillip Parker King, by Thomas Braidwood Wilson while exploring the region in December 1829.

The area around Lower King was a known haunt for sealers in 1831. It was settled later in the 1830s but the townsite was not gazetted until 1959.

The Lower King River Bridge was constructed in 1898 and washed away during a storm in 1900. Both the upper and lower bridges were damaged during storms in 1902. In 1944 and 1947 parts of the lower bridge collapsed and rebuilt.

In January 2019 the Upper King Bridge was burned by a deliberately lit fire causing 300,000 in damage.

Tributaries 

References

Further reading
 Muirden, Peter: Pen, Luke and Marnie Leybourne (2003) Stream and catchment hydrology in South West Western Australia Perth, W.A. Dept. of Environment. Department of Environment river restoration, 1442-6919 ; report no. RR19 
 Pen, Luke J.(1999) Managing our rivers : a guide to the nature and management of the streams of south-west Western Australia (editor, June Hutchison) East Perth, W.A. : Water and Rivers Commission.

External links

Rivers of the Great Southern region
Albany, Western Australia